Dan Kelly (born May 17, 1989) is an American former professional ice hockey defenceman who most recently played under contract with the San Jose Sharks of the National Hockey League (NHL).  he is part of the Kitchener Dutchmen coaching staff.

Playing career
Kelly was drafted by the Kitchener Rangers in the third round of the 2005 Ontario Hockey League draft. He was named captain midway through the 2008-09 season.

On May 19, 2010, Kelly was signed by the New Jersey Devils as a free agent. On August 30, 2014, Kelly was re-signed to a two-year, two-way $1.1 million contract with the Devils. On May 12, 2016, Kelly was assessed a ten-game suspension by the American Hockey League for an illegal check to the head of Toronto Marlies forward Andreas Johnson during a playoff game.
  
Kelly spent the duration of his six-year tenure within the Devils organization, with AHL affiliate, the Albany Devils. On July 11, 2016, having left the New Jersey Devils as a free agent, Kelly agreed to a one-year, two-way contract with the San Jose Sharks. After retiring from hockey following the 2016–17 season, Kelly joined the Kitchener Dutchmen as a coach.

Officiating career
Prior to the start of the 2019–20 NHL season, Kelly signed an officiating deal with the National Hockey League.

Career statistics

References

External links

1989 births
Albany Devils players
Kitchener Rangers players
Ice hockey coaches from New York (state)
Living people
San Jose Barracuda players
American men's ice hockey defensemen
National Hockey League officials
Ice hockey players from New York (state)